Iceland was represented at the Eurovision Song Contest 1990 by Stjórnin with the song "Eitt lag enn". Stjórnin was the winner of the Icelandic national final, Söngvakeppni Sjónvarpsins 1990, organised by Icelandic broadcaster Ríkisútvarpið (RÚV).

Before Eurovision

Söngvakeppni Sjónvarpsins 1990 
Söngvakeppnin Sjónvarpsins 1990 was the fifth edition of Söngvakeppnin Sjónvarpsins, the music competition that selects Iceland's entries for the Eurovision Song Contest.

Semi-finals 
The first semi-final took place on 27 January 1990 and six of the competing acts performed. The top three entries decided by a jury of 60 people in the studio audience advanced to the final.

The second semi-final took place on 3 February 1990 and six of the competing acts performed. The top three entries decided by a jury of 60 people in the studio audience advanced to the final.

Final 
The final was held on 10 February 1990 at the RÚV studios in Reykjavík, hosted by Edda Andrésdóttir. 6 songs competed, with the winner being selected by the votes of nine juries - eight regional juries and a final professional jury.

At Eurovision 
Beinteinsdóttir and Örvarsson, now as Stjórnin, performed 8th on the night of the contest, held in Zagreb, Yugoslavia, following the United Kingdom and preceding Norway. They received 124 points for her performance of "Eitt lag enn", placing 4th of 22 competing countries, which was Iceland's best result in Eurovision until 1999.

Voting

References

External links 
Icelandic National Final 1990

1990
Countries in the Eurovision Song Contest 1990
Eurovision